The International Journal of Tourism Sciences is a peer-reviewed academic journal of tourism published triannually by the Tourism Sciences Society of Korea. The journal was established in 2001 and is listed in the Korea Citation Index. The current co-editors-in-chief is Timothy Lee, University of the Sunshine Coast, Queensland, Australia. The International Journal of Tourism Sciences is included in Charles Goeldner's Select List of Tourism Journals. and among the List of Scientific Journals in the Encyclopedia of Worldwide Tourism Research.

References

External links 
 
 Tourism Sciences Society of Korea
 International Journal of Tourism Sciences on DBPIA
 Encyclopedia of Worldwide Tourism Research

English-language journals
Publications established in 2001
Triannual journals
Tourism journals